Dughayi (also Romanized as Dūghāyī; also known as Dowghā’ī, Doqā’ī, Dowqā’ī, Dughai, and Dūghānī) is a village in Dughayi Rural District, in the Central District of Quchan County, Razavi Khorasan Province, Iran. At the 2006 census, its population was 1,086, in 297 families.

References 

Populated places in Quchan County